The Jaysh al-Ababil (Arabic: جيش الأبابيل) was a rebel group active during the Syrian Civil War. It joined the Southern Front on 14 February 2014. The group was active in the Damascus Governorate.

See also
List of armed groups in the Syrian Civil War

References

External links
  

Anti-government factions of the Syrian civil war